Ceramide synthase 3 (CersS3), also known as longevity assurance homologue 3, is an enzyme that is encoded in humans by the CERS3 gene.

Function 

CerS3 synthesizes C24-ceramides and ceramides with longer acyl chains, and is found mainly in skin and testis. Specifically, CerS3 synthesizes ceramides containing α-hydroxy (2-hydroxy) fatty acids, which are abundant in skin tissue, where they help maintain the water permeability barrier qualities of the skin. It is found in large quantities in keratinocytes, and this increases during keratinocyte differentiation.

In the testes, CerS3 is involved in sperm formation and androgen production. Cers3 gene expression is located within germ cells, where it is massively upregulated during juvenile testicular maturation. This upregulation is correlated with increase in levels of glycosphingolipids containing very long chain (C26-C32) polyunsaturated fatty acid (LC-PUFA), which are required for spermatogenesis.

Tissue and cellular distribution 

CerS3 (T3l) mRNA is strongly expressed in skin, and was also found in brain, lung and kidney. CerS3 is mainly found in the skin and testes. CerS3 is not detectable in the brain or the sciatic nerve. Like other ceramide synthases, CerS3 is found in the endoplasmic reticulum within the cell.

Structure 

CerS3 has a molecular mass of 46.2 kDa, 383 amino acids, and six transmembrane domains. Like other ceramide synthases, CerS3 contains a Hox-like domain. CerS3 is the only ceramide synthase for which splice variants have not been reported.

References 

EC 2.3.1
Integral membrane proteins